is a Buddhist temple located in the Gōtokuji district of Setagaya ward, Tokyo, Japan. 

It is known as the "cat temple" because of the Maneki-neko.

References

External links

Buddhist temples in Tokyo
Buildings and structures in Setagaya
Musashi Province